Galerie Eva Presenhuber is a contemporary art gallery, owned by Eva Presenhuber, with locations in Zurich, Switzerland (since 2003) and Vienna (since 2022).

Eva Presenhuber founded Galerie Eva Presenhuber in October 2003 in Zurich, with an inaugural exhibition of paintings by Verne Dawson; Dawson, an American painter, continues to be represented by Presenhuber. Several artists whose careers Presenhuber helped launch in the 1990s continue to be part of the gallery program, including Ugo Rondinone, Doug Aitken, Joe Bradley, and Liam Gillick.

After several years exhibiting in the Löwenbräu Areal, Presenhuber opened a secondary space in the Diagonal building at the former Maag Areal. The new gallery – designed by Andreas Fuhrimann and Gabrielle Hächler architects – opened with a major exhibition by Austrian artist Franz West in April 2011, and was Presenhuber's only Zurich location from late 2017 to early 2020.
In Spring 2017, Presenhuber opened an exhibition space designed by Annabelle Selldorf in New York, and the inaugural show by Austrian painter Tobias Pils was his first solo exhibition in the city.

In June 2020, Eva Presenhuber opened a second location in Zurich at Waldmannstrasse 6.

In April 2022, Eva Presenhuber expanded further by opening a gallery in Vienna.

Artists
Among others, Galerie Eva Presenhuber has been representing the following living artists: 
 Jean-Marie Appriou (since 2018) 
 Lucas Blalock (since 2018) 
 Trisha Donnelly
 Carroll Dunham
 Sam Falls
 Shara Hughes (since 2018) 
 Ugo Rondinone
 Tschabalala Self (since 2019) 
 Peter Fischli David Weiss (since 1983)

References

External links
 Official website

Art museums and galleries in Zurich
Contemporary art galleries in Switzerland
Art galleries established in 2003
2003 establishments in Switzerland